is a passenger railway station in the city of Tōgane, Chiba Japan, operated by the East Japan Railway Company (JR East).

Lines

Station layout
The station consists of a single side platform serving bidirectional traffic. There is a rain shelter built on the platform, but no station building. The platform is short, and can only handle trains up to six cars long. The station is unattended.

History
Fukutawara Station opened on March 1, 1938, as a station on the Japanese Government Railways (JGR). It was closed from August 10, 1941 to October 1, 1954. The station was absorbed into the JR East network upon the privatization of JNR on April 1, 1987.

Passenger statistics
In fiscal 2006, the station was used by an average of 578 passengers daily (boarding passengers only).

Surrounding area

See also
 List of railway stations in Japan

References

External links

 JR East station information 

Railway stations in Chiba Prefecture
Stations of East Japan Railway Company
Railway stations in Japan opened in 1938
Tōgane Line
Tōgane